The Andrew P. Frizzell House and Farm Complex is a historic home and farm complex located at Westminster, Carroll County, Maryland, United States.

Characteristics
It is a well-preserved example of the Victorian style. It is a two-story brick home built in 1896 with a five-bay symmetrical façade. Also on the property are a washhouse/smokehouse, privy, chicken house, corn crib, and bank barn. Its owner, Andrew P. Frizzell, hosted a reception for Republican Governor Lloyd Lowndes at his farm shortly after the house was constructed.

The Andrew P. Frizzell House was listed on the National Register of Historic Places in 1986.

References

External links
, including photo from 1986, at Maryland Historical Trust

Houses on the National Register of Historic Places in Maryland
Houses in Carroll County, Maryland
Houses completed in 1896
Victorian architecture in Maryland
Westminster, Maryland
National Register of Historic Places in Carroll County, Maryland